KZUU (90.7 FM) is a radio station  broadcasting in an educational format in the northwest United States, licensed to Pullman, Washington. Serving the Palouse region, the station is currently owned by Washington State University in Pullman.

About 
KZUU is a non-commercial college radio station dedicated to providing listeners with an alternative to commercial radio. They are dedicated to supporting independent and underground artists in a variety of genres. They attempt to represent the best in contemporary hip hop, metal, indie rock, electronica, and jazz.

History 
KZUU began as a cable station, KAZU, in the spring of 1977 while the Federal Communications Commission (FCC) considered an application from the Associated Students of Washington State University (ASWSU) for a ten-watt FM license.  The construction permit was granted in the spring of 1979, and the tower erected on top of the Compton Union Building (CUB) in August. After testing, the station went on the air from the CUB's third floor at 8:26 a.m. PDT on Thursday, September 20, the first day of registration for the fall 1979 semester.

See also
KUOI – at the University of Idaho in nearby Moscow
KEXP – formerly KCMU at the University of Washington in Seattle

References

External links

Washington State Magazine article on the station's 25th anniversary (PUB May 2005)

ZUU
ZUU
Pullman, Washington